All American Orgy is a 2009 dark comedy written by Ted Beck and directed by Andrew Drazek. The film premiered October 11, 2009 at the New Orleans Film Festival.

Premise 
Three couples try group sex at a lakeside strawberry farm, naively hoping it will lead to enlightenment.

Cast 
 Laura Silverman as Tina
 Adam Busch as Alan
 Aimee-Lynn Chadwick as Rachel
 Jordan Kessler as Gordon
 Yasmine Kittles as Yasmine
 Ted Beck as Todd
 Edrick Browne as Larenz

Release 
Originally produced as Cummings Farm, the film was acquired by Phase 4 Films at the 2010 Slamdance Film Festival. The film was released on DVD and digital under its new title on October 5, 2010 and also picked up by the Showtime Network.

The film was given a classification of 18 by the British Board of Film Classification.

Reception 
The film received reviews from publications including Decider, LA Weekly, Slackerwood, eFilmCritic, and FilmMonthly.

References

External links
 

2009 films
2009 black comedy films
2009 independent films
American black comedy films
American independent films
2000s English-language films
Films set in Louisiana
Films shot in Louisiana
Phase 4 Films films
American sex comedy films
2000s sex comedy films
2009 directorial debut films
2009 comedy films
2000s American films